North Head Lighthouse may refer to:
North Head Light, Ilwaco, Washington, USA
North Head Lighthouse, Saldanha Bay, Western Cape, South Africa